Akarotaxis is a monotypic genus of marine ray-finned fish belonging to the family Bathydraconidae, the Antarctic dragonfish, its only species is Akarotaxis nudiceps. They are found in the Southern Ocean along the continental shelf of Antarctica.

Taxonomy
Akarotaxis was first described as a genus in 1980 by the American ichthyologist Hugh Hamilton DeWitt and the French ichthyologist Jean-Claude Hureau. Its only species is Akarotaxis nudiceps which was described in 1916 as Bathydraco nudiceps by the British-born Australian zoologist Edgar Ravenswood Waite with the type locality given as Queen Mary Land off the Shackleton Ice Shelf. The type was collected by the Australasian Antarctic Expedition. The generic name compounds akaro meaning "short" or "small" with "taxis" which means "line" or "row", a reference to the short upper lateral line, which comprises lees than 10 tubular scales. The specific name nudiceps means "naked head", thought to be an allusion to the absence of scales on the head despite Waite not mentioning this trait.

Description
Akarotaxis has a slender, body which is covered in ctenoid scales and has two lateral lines, the upper lateral line having only 3-9 tubed scales in its anterior section with its posterior part being made up of poredscales which also make up the middle lateral line. The upper rear margin of the operculum has a small hook. The are equipped with small conical teeth arranged in bands. The dorsal fin has 29-33 soft rays while the anal fin has 25-28 soft rays. Specimens preserved in alcohol have a brown body with a darker head, a pale dorsal fin pale and the other fins being dusky.

Distribution, habitat and biology
It has the lowest known fecundity of the Antractic dragonfishes, laying only 2000 eggs per female. Spawning takes place from mid to late summer.

References

Bathydraconidae
Monotypic fish genera
Fish of Antarctica
Taxa named by Edgar Ravenswood Waite
Taxa named by H. H. DeWitt
Fish described in 1916